Devann Grey Joseph Yao (born April 5, 1990) is an American soccer player who plays as a midfielder.

Club career
Born in New York to an Ivorian father and Italian mother, Yao moved to Europe at a young age. He first joined FC Metz in France at age of 13. He spent four years in their youth system before joining AS Livorno in Italy, where he played for their youth and reserve teams. Yao then signed with St. Mirren of the Scottish Championship but left due to lack of playing time with the first team.

Yao briefly returned to the United States to trial with the New York Red Bulls but failed to secure a contract, returning to the United Kingdom to sign with Ipswich Town. However, he was released from Ipswich Town in 2010 without playing any match with the first team.

In 2011, Yao went to Borinage in the Belgian Second Division. In 2013, he signed with UR La Louvière Centre.

In 2014, after three years in Belgium, Yao headed to Germany, where he joined TSG Neustrelitz in the German fourth tier. After scoring eight goals in 23 matches for Berliner AK 07 in the 2016–2017 season, he signed with SV Meppen in the German 3. Liga.

Yao joined FC Victoria Rosport on 1 January 2019, after signing for the club in December. He left the club already on 10 April 2019.

On September 20, 2019, Yao returned to the United States, joining USL Championship side Fresno FC for the remainder of their 2019 season. He left the club at the end of the year and then returned to Germany, joining Berlin-Liga club FC Brandenburg 03 in the beginning of 2020.

References

External links
 
 
 Devann Yao at FuPa

1990 births
Living people
American people of Ivorian descent
Sportspeople from Manhattan
Soccer players from New York City
American people of Italian descent
American soccer players
Association football midfielders
Challenger Pro League players
Regionalliga players
3. Liga players
USL Championship players
Ipswich Town F.C. players
UR La Louvière Centre players
TSG Neustrelitz players
Kickers Offenbach players
Berliner AK 07 players
SV Meppen players
FC Victoria Rosport players
Fresno FC players
American expatriate soccer players
American expatriate sportspeople in France
Expatriate footballers in France
American expatriate sportspeople in Italy
Expatriate footballers in Italy
American expatriate sportspeople in Scotland
Expatriate footballers in Scotland
American expatriate sportspeople in England
Expatriate footballers in England
American expatriate sportspeople in Belgium
Expatriate footballers in Belgium
American expatriate soccer players in Germany
Expatriate footballers in Germany